Corporal Emma Fowler (born 5 June 1979) is a British biathlete who in 2006 became the first British female biathlete to compete at the Winter Olympics. She has been a member of the Royal Logistic Corps, and is from Taunton, Somerset.

Career
Fowler began competing in biathlon in 1997, and made her international debut in 1998. She qualified to compete in the 2006 Winter Olympics in Turin, becoming the first female British biathlete to do so. She finished 78th in the 15km individual event, and 67th in the 7.5km sprint event. She competed at the Biathlon World Championships in 2001, 2005, 2007, 2008, and 2009. She failed to qualify for the 2010 Winter Olympics. Fowler is coached by Walter Pichler. Fowler was selected for the London 2012 torch relay in Taunton; she was handed the torch by will.i.am.

Aside from her biathlon career, Fowler has served in the 1 Regiment RLC of the Royal Logistic Corps.

References

External links
Olympic Profile

Team GB Profile

English female biathletes
Sportspeople from Taunton
1979 births
Living people
Biathletes at the 2006 Winter Olympics
Olympic biathletes of Great Britain
Royal Logistic Corps soldiers